Nella Martinetti (21 January 1946 – 29 July 2011) was a Swiss singer-songwriter, affectionately nicknamed "Bella Nella".

She was born in Brissago, Ticino, Switzerland. In 1986, she became the first winner of the Grand Prix der Volksmusik with the song "Bella Musica", which she composed. In 1987, along with Atilla Şereftuğ, Martinetti approached a then unknown young Canadian singer Céline Dion, asking her to represent Switzerland in the 1988 Eurovision Song Contest. Dion won the Eurovision Song Contest with the song "Ne partez pas sans moi."

Martinetti entered into a civil union with her longtime partner Marianne Schneebeli in 2009.

Martinetti died in Männedorf, Canton of Zürich, Switzerland aged 65, in 2011, from pancreatic cancer.

References

External links

 Martinetti's Yahoo.com music page
 Nella Martinetti's official website

1946 births
2011 deaths
20th-century Swiss women singers
Swiss singer-songwriters
Eurovision Song Contest winners
Deaths from pancreatic cancer
Deaths from cancer in Switzerland
People from Brissago
Swiss-Italian people
Women songwriters
Swiss folk singers
Swiss LGBT singers
Swiss LGBT songwriters